Family Inverted Coaster is a steel roller coaster at Happy Valley Shanghai in China. It is the first Family Inverted Coaster manufactured by Bolliger & Mabillard.

Roller coasters in China